The 2006 National Rugby League season consisted of 25 weekly regular season rounds starting on 11 March, followed by four weeks of play-offs that culminated in a grand final on 1 October.

Regular season

Round 1

Round 2
Many records were broken in this round. The Cowboy's Matt Sing scores his 150th try in first-grade, the sixth player to do so. Canterbury's Hazem El Masri scored 34 points, a club record.
The extremely hot conditions on the Sunday afternoon of this round affected two games in particular. In Wollongong, a slow-moving, somewhat sloppy game saw St George Illawarra in their first ever period of golden point extra time, going down to Penrith 13-12. On the other hand, at Canberra, an all-time premiership record 102 points were scored between Newcastle and Canberra. This surpasses the previous record of 97 points scored in St. George's 91-6 defeat of Canterbury in 1935.

Round 3
The Newcastle Knights has scored 116 points in the last two weeks with a 46-22 win over the Canterbury Bulldogs
The Brisbane Broncos have won their first back to back wins since rounds 18 and 19 of the previous season.
 The Raiders have conceded 126 points in their last 2 games after a 56-20 loss to the Roosters.

Round 4
Cronulla Sharks won their first game of the season win a 24-22 win over the South Sydney Rabbitohs
 The Panthers became the first team to play back to back Golden Point matches.

Round 5
It was a Grand Final rematch between the North Queensland Cowboys and the Wests Tigers, this time the previous season's runners-up North Queensland taking the game 32-12.
The Bulldogs became the first team to win after a Bye this year with a comprehensive 12-30 drubbing of the Raiders in Canberra

Round 6
A very rare event occurred in Round 6 – a referee was injured during a match. In the 28th minute of the Newcastle vs Nth Qld match, referee Paul Simpkins blew time off and made his way off the field with an injured calf muscle. A replacement referee was organised – Tony De Las Heras, who had refereed the Jersey Flegg (third-tier competition) match earlier, was brought onto the field to take control of the rest of the match. Coincidentally, De Las Heras was the subject of the next instance a referee was injured in an NRL match, in Round 19, 2009.

Also, for the first time in 8 years, first grade competitive rugby league returned to Adelaide after the Adelaide Rams were excluded from the competition after the 1998 season. The Penrith Panthers hosted the Melbourne Storm at Hindmarsh Stadium, which was won by Melbourne 40-18. However, Rugby league officials were hoping for an attendance of at least 10,000, and were disappointed with the attendance of only 7,017.

Round 7

Round 8
Brisbane Broncos recorded their biggest comeback in the club's history when they came from 18-0 down at halftime to win 30-28 against the Canberra Raiders at Suncorp Stadium.

Round 9

Round 10

Round 11
Parramatta played their first game under stand-in coach Jason Taylor, following Brian Smith's resignation earlier in the week. Following this announcement, star Parramatta players Mark Riddell and Tim Smith were fined $5000 each and relegated to Premier League by Parramatta after turning up to Monday morning training intoxicated.
All six home teams won their respective matches over the weekend.

Round 12
Cronulla Sharks hooker Tevita Latu is stood down from the club on Monday 22 May after claims from 19-year-old Brooke Peninton that the player punched her in the face. After being arrested on late on Monday, he was granted police bail to face Sutherland Local Court on 15 June. He was later sacked by the Cronulla club and deregistered by the National Rugby League the following Wednesday.
 For just the 3rd time since its inception in 2003, there were 2 Golden Point games in the same round.

Round 13
It took 70 minutes to score a point in the St. George Illawarra Dragons and Parramatta Eels game with Parramatta's five-eighth John Morris popped over a field goal to make it 1-0 to Parramatta. But eventually St. George Illwarra found their rhythm to go out 8-1 winners.

Round 14
 The South Sydney Rabbitohs were able to record their first victory for the 2006 season, taking advantage of Brisbane's depleted line-up due to State of Origin commitments to prevail 34-14 at Telstra Stadium. A crowd of just 6,537, the smallest crowd to date in 2006, braved the cold, wet weather to witness this intriguing game. It was also the Rabbitohs' first victory over Brisbane in 17 years.

Round 15
St George Illawarra hooker Shaun Timmins is charged by Brisbane police on Saturday 17 June with public nuisance. Having not even played in the Dragon's match against the Brisbane Broncos the night earlier, it was alleged Timmins sat on a street sweeper whilst making his way back to his hotel room at around 3:30 am. Early reports quote the club's chief executive Peter Doust as saying that Timmins was not intoxicated at the time as far as he was aware. Media figures later summed this up as an over-reaction and, while not encouraging Timmins' actions, noted that it was an act of larrikinism rather than malice.

Round 16
For the third week in a row, the Friday night game was won in the last minute, this time it was the Melbourne Storm winning 16-12 after trailing 12-10 with 3 seconds to go against the Canterbury Bulldogs.
Wests Tigers' five-eighth Benji Marshall dislocated his right shoulder yet again, which ended his season.
The Sydney Roosters' Craig Fitzgibbon and Brett Finch got into a swearing match during their match against the Canberra Raiders.
The South Sydney Rabbitohs suffered their worst defeat in the club's history with a humiliating 66-0 loss to the New Zealand Warriors.

Round 17

Round 18
 Newcastle Knights captain Andrew Johns became the all-time highest pointscorer in the 98-year history of top grade Rugby League in Australia, but caused controversy after his sides horrific 46-12 loss to the Parramatta Eels, by walking off field and ignoring a special presentation organised by the Eels officials, including Parramatta Eels coach Jason Taylor, who previously held the record.
 The Bulldogs gave themselves one of their biggest comebacks in the Club's history and the Warriors one of their worst collapses in their Club's history when the Bulldogs came from 16-0 down midway through the first half to win 22-18 in extra time at ANZ Stadium.
 Also, the Tigers appeared to be back on track with a 22-10 victory over the Cronulla Sharks at Toyota Park.

Round 19

Round 20

 This was the first time that the Sydney Roosters were held scoreless since Round 15 1994, Ending A 311 Game Run Scoring at Least One Point.

Round 21
 The South Sydney Rabbitohs recorded only their second win for the season with a 21-8 win over the Canberra Raiders at Telstra Stadium.

Round 22
Rugby league returned to the Central Coast for the first time in 2006, with over 18,000 packing into the picturesque Bluetongue Central Coast Stadium at Gosford to witness the Roosters play the Knights.
Parramatta continued their winning streak with a victory over the Dragons, Cronulla slumped to another loss, whilst Melbourne and the Bulldogs all but extinguished the hopes of the 2005 Grand Finalists with big victories over the Wests Tigers and North Queensland Cowboys respectively.
South Sydney recorded back-to-back victories for the only time this season.

Round 23
 Refereeing woes continues in a thrilling Golden Point clash at Campbelltown, marred by referee Steve Clark's incorrect interpretation of the offside rule. Failure to penalise resulted in a late field goal to Canberra Raiders, winning them the match.
 The Cronulla Sharks and North Queensland Cowboys fell further out of favour for a top eight berth with poor performances on Saturday night, whilst the Bulldogs extended their run to six straight with a victory over the Dragons.
 The Tigers and Raiders became the first teams (and so far, only) to play 2 Golden Point games over the course of the season, it was also the Raiders record 4th game in Golden Point in 2006, remarkably winning all of them, the Raiders record of most Golden Point games in a season hasn't been bettered, but has since been equalled by The Eels in 2011 who didn't win any, drew 1 and lost the other 3 and the Tigers in 2012 winning 2 and losing the remaining 2.
 Craig Fitzgibbon became the highest scoring forward this round, overtaking David Furner's previous record of 1218.

 *Extra Time was played

Round 24
Several surprising results changed the face of the competition in Round 24. The most notable of these was the fall of first and second placed Melbourne and the Bulldogs to much less fancied opponents. The latter side suffered greatly in their 30-0 loss to the Brisbane Broncos, with 2 players suffering major injuries and their star forward Willie Mason receiving a two match suspension.
Penrith's victory over Cronulla in the dying moments saw the clear eight cut and dried, although the Panthers did have a small chance of making the final eight had results gone their way.
St George Illawarra fought their way back to form with a 30-point victory over the Wests Tigers.
 Despite the fact they lost their first game since Round 11, and their first match at home all season, the Storm secured the Minor Premiership this round after the Broncos beat the 2nd placed Bulldogs.

Round 25
Controversy struck the NRL once again, when North Queensland Cowboys player Mitchell Sargent testing positive to the drug cocaine. He was immediately sacked from the club.
The Panthers were the only team outside the eight before Round 25 with a slight chance of becoming finalists. However, with the Panthers losing, the top eight became set in stone, meaning no other team was able to make the final series.
For the second week in a row, the Broncos held their opponents scoreless beating Parramatta 23-0, it was the first time this has happened since Round 13 and 14 1999, that time was also Brisbane.

Round 26
With one round to go, the top eight had already settled, with no team outside the top eight able to make the final series. Teams between positions three and six were all in with a chance to host a home semi final at the start at the round and the jostling for positions continued over the weekend. The top eight was finalised on Sunday when the Brisbane Broncos defeated the New Zealand Warriors 36-12. The Melbourne Storm and Bulldogs had their final positions locked in going into the final round.
Coaching dramas engulfed the game leading into Round 26, with the news that Ricky Stuart was to be dumped as the coach of the Sydney Roosters for the 2007 NRL Season. Whilst a replacement is yet to be found, The South Sydney Rabbitohs were quick to tie up any chance of losing incoming assistant coach Jason Taylor by promoting him to head coach for the coming season.

Finals

Week One

First Qualifying Final

Second Qualifying Final

Third Qualifying Final

Fourth Qualifying Final

There was major controversy in this match when, approximately 15 minutes from full-time, Parramatta second-rower Glenn Morrison crashed over the Melbourne Storm line. With the decision sent to the Video Referee (Bill Harrigan) it appeared that Morrison deserved a Try- Benefit of the doubt. However, Harrigan ruled he had been held up by Storm fullback Billy Slater and the try was not awarded.

Week Two

First Semi Final

Second Semi Final

Week Three

First Preliminary Final

Second Preliminary Final

Grand final 

 This was the first Grand Final where there were no Sydney teams featuring in the Grand Final.
 This was the first Grand Final meeting between these 2 sides.

References

Results
National Rugby League season results